Glenn Feidanga is a Central African basketball player who played college basketball for the Long Island Brooklyn Blackbirds.

International career 
Feidanga was named to the preliminary Central African Republic squad for the AfroBasket 2015 by head coach Aubin-Thierry Goporo.

References

External links 
Glenn Feidanga at USbasket.com
Glenn Feidanga at RealGM
LIU Brooklyn Blackbirds bio

1994 births
Living people
Centers (basketball)
Central African Republic expatriate basketball people in the United States
Central African Republic men's basketball players
LIU Brooklyn Blackbirds men's basketball players
People from Bangui
Power forwards (basketball)